Eugene Ambuchi Asike (born 30 November 1993) is a Kenyan international footballer who plays for Swedish club Karlstad, as a centre back.

Career
Asike has played club football for Kenya Commercial Bank, Sofapaka and Tusker. In April 2022 he signed for Swedish club Karlstad.

He made his international debut for Kenya in 2012.

References

1993 births
Living people
Kenyan footballers
Kenya international footballers
Kenya Commercial Bank S.C. players
Sofapaka F.C. players
Gor Mahia F.C. players
IF Karlstad Fotboll players
Kenyan Premier League players
Association football defenders
Kenyan expatriate footballers
Kenyan expatriate sportspeople in Sweden
Expatriate footballers in Sweden